Milan Gulaš (born December 30, 1985) is a Czech professional ice hockey forward currently playing as Captain of Motor České Budějovice in the Czech Extraliga (ELH). He originally played with České Budějovice in the Czech Extraliga during the 2010–11 Czech Extraliga season.

Gulaš played previously for SK Horácká Slavia Třebíč and HC Kladno.

Career statistics

Regular season and playoffs

International

References

External links 
 

1985 births
Living people
Färjestad BK players
Indiana Ice players
Rytíři Kladno players
Metallurg Magnitogorsk players
Motor České Budějovice players
HC Plzeň players
Czech ice hockey forwards
Sportspeople from České Budějovice
SK Horácká Slavia Třebíč players
Czech expatriate ice hockey players in Russia
Czech expatriate ice hockey players in Sweden
Czech expatriate ice hockey players in the United States